Oedodera marmorata, also known as the marbled gecko, is a species of gecko endemic to New Caledonia.

References

Diplodactylidae
Taxa named by Aaron M. Bauer
Taxa named by Todd R. Jackman
Taxa named by Ross Allen Sadlier
Taxa named by Anthony Whitaker
Monotypic lizard genera